Haldorsen is a surname. Notable people with the surname include:

Finn Haldorsen (1934–2005), Norwegian businessman
Haldor Andreas Haldorsen (1883–1965), Norwegian politician
Inger Haldorsen (1899–1982), Norwegian physician, midwife and politician
Magne Haldorsen (1925–2005), Norwegian politician
Ola Haldorsen (born 1965), Norwegian footballer

Norwegian-language surnames